Skunked TV is an American comedy television series that originally aired on the Discovery Kids on NBC block. Children are pranked by seeing animals do weird activities (such as letting birds fly out a cage while the children are supposed to watch them and being blamed by the "zoo keeper" hosts) on the show. The host was Madai Zaldivar and the co-host was Chuck Cureau. The series ran in 2004 but was canceled after one season of 15 episodes.

Episodes

1. Who let the Bird Out?

2. Scrambled Eggs

3. Egg Drop

4. Tangled Web

5. Dog for a Day

6. Bird Brain

7. For the Birds

8. Swine Song

9. Leapin' Lemur

10. Cat-Napped

11. Love Stinks

12. Egg Head

13. Super Size Surprise

14. Stinker

15. Whale of a Tale

References

2004 American television series debuts
2004 American television series endings
2000s American comedy television series
Discovery Kids original programming
American educational television series
American hidden camera television series
English-language television shows